Bagha Purana or Bhagha Purana is a city and a Municipal Council in Moga district in the state of Punjab, India.

The town 
Bagha Purana lies on the main road connecting Moga and Faridkot and thus is a major hub for buses to all across Punjab. BaghaPurana's police station has the largest jurisdiction in Punjab as a chain of over 65 "pinds" or villages are within its control. The town is divided into 3 'pattis' or sections: Muglu Patti (biggest one), Bagha Patti, and Purana Patti. The town has its fair share of rich people and thus the standard of living is above average as compared to the surrounding towns and villages.

Demographics
 India census, 
Bagha Purana Municipal Council has population of 25,206 of which 13,288 are males while 11,918 are females.

Population of Children with age of 0-6 is 2764 which is 10.97% of total population of Bagha Purana. In Bagha Purana, Female Sex Ratio is of 897 against state average of 895. Moreover, Child Sex Ratio in Bagha Purana is around 839 compared to Punjab state average of 846. Literacy rate of Bagha Purana city is 76.13% higher than state average of 75.84%. In Bagha Purana, Male literacy is around 79.25% while female literacy rate is 72.67%.

Bagha Purana was a small village till the early 70s primarily consisting of three pattis namely Bagha Patti, Purana Patti and Mughlu Patti. This small village located on the intersection of Moga-Kotkapura road and Mudki-Nihal Singh Wala road got prominence after a Government Polytechnic was established, a few kilometers away. Thereafter it became a trade center of the villages around it and developed into a small town. The village got a status of town when a Nagar Panchayat (smallest form of urban local self-government unit) was formed in 1974 which was upgraded to a Municipal Council, a few years ago. In 2000, it got the status of a sub-division headquarters which facilitated the establishment of all tehsil-level offices of the Government.

Earlier, the majority of the population thrived on agriculture, as such most of the other economic activity is driven by agriculture like agro based industry (rice-mills, cold stores etc.), commission agents etc. The tertiary activities include the transport and related businesses like finance etc. Many banks have opened their branches due to enhanced economic activity over the years, as well as the needs of the non-resident Indian community from this region, especially in Canada & Australia.

The town also boasts of being the home-town of some of the great personalities. To name a few, Major Malkit SIngh Brar, who was awarded the Mahavir Chakra (posthumously) in 1948 was born in Alam Wala (a small and first village near Bagha Purana) and He got educated here. He laid down his life fighting for the country in Poonch sector during the Indo-Pak war in 1948 and was the first in erstwhile Punjab (comprising present Punjab, Haryana, H.P and Delhi) and second in the country to be honored with Mahavir Chakra (the highest decoration award of the country). He is survived by his widow Smt. Balbir Kaur Brar who resides in Chandigarh.

Neighboring Villages 
Kotla Rai ka, Alamwala Kalan, Gill, Kaleke, Nathoke, Budh Singh Wala, Kotla Mehar Singh Wala, Gholia Kalan

References

External links 
 Bagha Purana

Gallery

Cities and towns in Moga district